Ulf Camitz (born 25 October 1960) is a retired Swedish football midfielder and later manager.

Playing for several modest teams in Sweden and Norway, he also played first-tier football for Strømsgodset until they were relegated in 1991. After one year in Sandefjord he travelled north to Lofoten in 1995. Leading Lofoten as a player-manager to an unprecedented spell in the 1999 1. divisjon, he was sacked post-promotion for lacking formal qualifications.

In 2000 he moved to Fauske/Sprint as manager. In 2003 he coached Steigen and ahead of the 2007 season he took over Grand Bodø's women's team. However, two days before the start of 2007 Toppserien he resigned, needing to prioritize his civic job when the coaching job took too much of his working week.

In 2017 he was declared an honorary member of FK Lofoten. In Strømsgodset too he is regarded as a club legend.

References

1960 births
Living people
Swedish footballers
Varbergs BoIS players
Åtvidabergs FF players
GAIS players
Kvik Halden FK players
Strømsgodset Toppfotball players
Sandefjord BK players
FK Lofoten players
Association football midfielders
Swedish expatriate footballers
Expatriate footballers in Norway
Swedish expatriate sportspeople in Norway
Swedish emigrants to Norway
Norwegian First Division players
Eliteserien players
Swedish football managers